Proline-rich protein 30 (PRR30 or C2orf53) is a protein in humans that is encoded for by the PRR30 gene. PRR30 is a member in the family of Proline-rich proteins characterized by their intrinsic lack of structure. Copy number variations in the PRR30 gene have been associated with an increased risk for neurofibromatosis.

Gene 
The PRR30 gene is located on the short arm of human chromosome 2 at band 2p23.3. It flanked by Prolactin regulatory element binding (PREB) and Transcription Factor 23 (TCF23). The gene has three Exons in total. PRR30 has a length of 2618 base pairs of linear DNA.

Promoter Region 
The PRR30 promoter directly flanks the gene and is 1162 base pairs in length.

Transcript 
The PRR30 mRNA transcript is 2063 base pairs in length. There are four splice sites total all of which are in the 5’ UTR. There are no known isoforms or alternative splicing of PRR30.

Protein 
Human protein PRR30 consists of 412 amino acid residues. It has a molecular weight of 44.7 kdal and an isoelectric point of 10.7. It is proline rich and composed primarily of non-essential amino acids. There is a region of extreme conservation across orthologs spanning from residues 187 to 321. PRR30 appears to be subcellularly localized to the cell nucleus. NetNES predicts a nuclear export signal from residues 213 to 216. IntAct predicts that PRR30 interacts with Human Testis Protein 37 or TEX37, Cystiene Rich Tail Protein 1 (CYSRT1), and Keratin Associated Protein 6-2 (KRTAP6-2). PRR30 is predicted to undergo post-translational modifications in the form of glycosylation and phosphorylation.

Structure 
PRR30 is an intrinsically disordered protein (IDP) and lacks any formal tertiary structure or quaternary structure. I-Tasser and Phyre predict minimal coiling throughout PRR30 as a whole. In the region of high conservation, there are predicted alpha helices & beta sheets.

Function 
Unstructured proteins like PRR30 are highly variable in function. Other Proline-Rich Proteins have been shown to have an affinity for binding calcium across different tissues in the human body. COACH predicts several ligand binding domains associated with calcium across PRR30. The highest confidence predicted calcium binding domain resides in the area of greatest conservation.

Expression 
NCBI EST profiles have shown differential expression across many tissues but increased levels in the human testes and pharynx.

Homology 
PRR30 is exclusive to mammals but is not present in all mammals. PRR30 is highly conserved across Primates but shows loss of the gene in members of Rodents and Laurasiatheria. The most distant known ortholog of PRR30 is found in S. harrisii, Tasmanian Devil. The PRR30 gene appears to be evolving relatively fast rate.

Paralogs 
There are no known paralogs for PRR30.

Orthologs 

This list is not comprehensive

Clinical significance 

In recent 2015 study, copy number variation of PRR30 gene was linked to an increase risk for neurofibromatosis. 78% of the patients displaying type 1-associated cutaneous neurofibromas carried an extra copy of the PRR30 gene. No mechanism was described illuminating the correlation.

References 

Human proteins